Robert Dwain Clark (November 13, 1944 – November 14, 2021) was an American child actor who worked under the name Bobby Clark.

Career
His longest lasting role was that of Casey Junior in the syndicated 1957-1958 television series, Casey Jones, starring Alan Hale Jr., in the title role, with supporting cast members Mary Lawrence as Mrs. Jones, Dub Taylor as Fireman Wallie Sims, and Eddy Waller as "Red Rock", the train conductor.

Clark appeared in the movies Invasion of the Body Snatchers, Ransom!, Gun Duel in Durango, Rebel in Town, The Happy Road, Bring Your Smile Along, and The Ten Commandments.

Clark made a guest appearance on Perry Mason as the title character in the 1958 episode, "The Case of the Pint-Sized Client". He also appeared in episodes of Alfred Hitchcock Presents, The Loretta Young Show, The Americans (a drama of the American Civil War), Lassie, General Electric Theater, Ford Theatre, Gunsmoke, Studio 57, The Pepsi-Cola Playhouse, Screen Directors Playhouse, Climax!, Front Row Center, Dick Powell's Zane Grey Theatre, Northwest Passage, Crossroads, and Bachelor Father.

The son of Robert Boyd Clark and Jean Dahl, Clark began his professional career at the age of six when he was introduced to the accordion. He played in many public events, including USO shows, professional wrestling matches, Kiwanis International, and the Benevolent and Protective Order of Elks. In 1954, he moved with his parents to Los Angeles. In addition to his movie and television appearances, he performed at the Hollywood Bowl and at local festivals and events.

After Clark semi-retired from show business, he still made occasional public appearances. He was as a guest of the 2012 Memphis Film Festival's "A Gathering of Guns 4: A TV Western Reunion" at the Whispering Woods Hotel and Conference Center in Olive Branch, Mississippi.

Clark's wife, Vikki, died on January 6, 2021, with his father following on April 15. Clark's own health began to decline, and he died in Humboldt County, California, on November 14, 2021, a day after his 77th birthday

Filmography

References

External links
 
 

1944 births
2021 deaths
American male television actors
American male film actors
American male child actors
Male actors from Seattle
Male actors from Los Angeles
People from Ferndale, California